Thomas Durkin may refer to:

 Thomas Durkin (rugby league) (1895–1958), rugby league footballer of the 1920s
 Thomas Anthony Durkin, American criminal defense attorney
 Thomas M. Durkin (born 1953), judge on the United States District Court for the Northern District of Illinois

See also
 Tom Durkin (disambiguation)